Jurmana may refer to:

 Jurmana (1979 film), a 1979 Hindi film
 Jurmana (1996 film), a 1996 Hindi film